Schiappa is a surname. Notable people with the surname include:

David J. Schiappa (born 1962), American politician
Edward Schiappa (born 1954), American academic
Marlène Schiappa (born 1982), French writer and politician